Wadi Bani Khaled is a Wilayat of Ash Sharqiyah North in the Sultanate of Oman.

References 

Populated places in Oman